The 2016 Trinidad and Tobago League Cup (known for sponsorship reasons as the 2016 First Citizens Cup) was the seventeenth season of the Trinidad and Tobago League Cup, which is the league cup competition for Trinidad and Tobago teams competing in the TT Pro League. W Connection entered as the cup holders having defeated Central by a score of 2–1 in the 2015 final. First Citizens Bank changed the slogan to "Where Winners Reign" due to the amount of money that the winner of the tournament would obtain. Team were drawn randomly where teams from numbers 7–10 enter at the play-offs, while numbers 1–6 enter at the quarterfinal stage. Defence Force won their 3rd title with a 1–0 win over Ma Pau Stars.

Draw Numbers
Police
Central
St. Ann's Rangers
W Connection
Point Fortin Civic
Morvant Caledonia United
Club Sando
Defence Force
San Juan Jabloteh
Ma Pau Stars

Results

Play Off Round

Quarterfinals

Semi-finals

Final

References 

Trinidad and Tobago League Cup